Haldia Assembly constituency is an assembly constituency in Purba Medinipur district in the Indian state of West Bengal. It is reserved for scheduled castes.

Overview
As per orders of the Delimitation Commission, No. 209 Haldia Assembly constituency (SC) is composed of the following: Haldia municipality and Sutahata community development block.

Haldia Assembly constituency is part of No. 30 Tamluk (Lok Sabha constituency).

Election results

2021

2016

2011

References

Assembly constituencies of West Bengal
Politics of Purba Medinipur district